The 1966 Major League Baseball (MLB) draft took place on Tuesday, June 7, early in the 1966 MLB season. The draft saw the New York Mets take Steve Chilcott first overall, with future Hall of Famer Reggie Jackson drafted second.

First round selections 

The following are the first round picks in the 1966 Major League Baseball draft.

* Did not sign

Other notable selections

* Did not sign

Notes

External links 
Complete draft list from The Baseball Cube database

References 

Major League Baseball draft
Draft
Major League Baseball draft